Fernanda Faria and Paula Cristina Gonçalves were the defending champions, but lost in the first round.

Fernanda Hermenegildo and Teliana Pereira won the tournament by defeating Maria Fernanda Alves and Roxane Vaisemberg in the final 3–6, 7–6(7–5), [11–9].

Seeds

Draw

References 
 Draw

MasterCard Tennis Cup - Doubles
MasterCard Tennis Cup
Mast